Douglas W. Arner is a Kerry Holdings Professor at the University of Hong Kong (HKU).

He is a Senior Fellow of Melbourne Law School, University of Melbourne, and a Non-Executive Director of Aptorum Group [NASDAQ: APM].

He led the development of the world’s largest massive open online course (MOOC): Introduction to FinTech, launched on edX in May 2018, now spanning every country in the world, as part of the first online Professional Certificate in FinTech.

Education

He holds a BA from Drury College (where he studied literature, economics and political science), a JD (cum laude) from Southern Methodist University, an LLM (with distinction) in banking and finance law from the University of London (Queen Mary College), and a PhD from the University of London.

Career

Arner was the Sir John Lubbock Support Fund Fellow at the Centre for Commercial Law Studies, Queen Mary College, University of London.

Arner joined at HKU in 2000 and was the Director of the Faculty’s Asian Institute of International Financial Law(AIIFL) from 2006 to 2011; he co-founded AIIFL in 1999 along with the LLM in Corporate and Financial Law.

Arner has been a visiting professor or fellow at Duke University, Harvard University, the Hong Kong Institute for Monetary Research, IDC Herzliya, McGill University, Melbourne University, National University of Singapore, Queen Mary University of London, University of New South Wales, Shanghai University of Finance and Economics, and Zurich University.

Awards
In 2007, he received HKU’s Outstanding Young Researcher Award.

Bibliography

Arner specialises in economic and financial law, regulation and development. He is author, co-author or editor of fifteen books, and author or co-author of more than 150 articles, chapters and reports on related subjects.

Selected works

References

External links
 Faculty of Law, HKU homepage: Professor Douglas Arner
 Melbourne Law School, The University of Melbourne homepage: Professor Douglas Arner

Living people
Hong Kong legal scholars
Academic staff of the University of Hong Kong
Drury University alumni
Southern Methodist University alumni
Alumni of Queen Mary University of London
Year of birth missing (living people)